Those We Leave Behind is the second and final studio album by post-hardcore band I Am Ghost, and was released on October 7, 2008. The sound of the album is considerably different: after the departure of the band's female vocalist/violinist Kerith Telestai, I Am Ghost recorded more melodic, yet lyrically darker songs, with a stronger indication towards punk.

Album information
I Am Ghost parted ways with their band members, Brian Telestai (bass, keys, vocals) and his wife Kerith Telestai (violin, vocals) parted ways with I Am Ghost after health problems arose for Kerith on their national tour with The Chariot. Kerith said goodbye during a show at warped tour, while Brian left after the West Coast Revival tour with Aiden. After the two members left, Ron Ficarro joined filling in for bass, and no replacement was made for Kerith Telestai.

Lead singer Steve Juliano discussed the new direction of the album:

Juliano wrote all of the lyrics on Those We Leave Behind. The album's music was primarily written by bassist Ron Ficarro with additional compositions from guitarist Tim Rosales III. On August 12, I Am Ghost uploaded "Bone Garden" onto their Myspace.

Track listing

Personnel 

Band
 Steven Juliano
 Ron Ficarro
 Tim Rosales III
 Justin McCarthy

Additional musicians
 Jon LaLopa – additional guitar
 Sharon Wang – violins (tracks: 1, 2, 4, 6, 10, 13)
 Justin Chapman – cello (tracks: 1, 2, 4, 6, 10, 13)
 Alison Murphy – reading (track: 1)
 Cody Leavitt – additional vocals (tracks: 2, 8)
 Ron Ficarro – orchestra arrangement

Artwork and design
 Nick Pritchard – art director, designer
 Bryan Sheffield – photography

Production and technical
 Paul Leavitt – producer, recording, engineer, mixing
 Cory Gable – additional Pro Tools engineer
 Michael Fossenkemper – mastering

Chart positions

References 

2008 albums
Epitaph Records albums
I Am Ghost albums